Chrysoritis zeuxo, the jitterbug daisy copper, is a butterfly of the family Lycaenidae. It is found in South Africa, where it is known from coastal fynbos in the Western Cape, from the Cape Peninsula to the Knysna area.

The wingspan is 22–25 mm for males and 24–28 mm for females. Adults are on wing from September to January, with a peak from October to November. There is one generation per year.

The larvae feed on Chrysanthemoides monilifera. They are attended to by Crematogaster liengmei ants.

Subspecies
Chrysoritis zeuxo cottrelli (Dickson, 1975) is either treated as a valid species or subspecies of Chrysoritis zeuxo.

References

Butterflies described in 1764
Chrysoritis
Endemic butterflies of South Africa
Taxa named by Carl Linnaeus